Morrell Park is a neighborhood located in southwest Baltimore, Maryland, United States.

History and geography

Morrell Park, together with Westport, Violetville, and Mount Winans, were originally part of a tract of land named "Georgia," or "Georgia Plantation," and later called "Mount Clare." This survey, which measured , was deeded to Dr. Charles Carroll in 1732.

The current Morrell Park is bounded by Hollins Ferry Road, the B&O Railroad tracks and Gwynns Falls to the east, I-95 to the north, Caton Avenue to the west and CSX Transportation tracks to the south.

At one point the neighborhood had trolley tracks running down Washington Boulevard; today the only mass transit serving the neighborhood is MTA Bus line 36, formerly MTA Bus line 11.

Schools

Morrell Park has one public school in the neighborhood, Morrell Park Elementary/Middle School. Digital Harbor High School serves Morrell Park families, although it is not located in the neighborhood.

Recreation

Morrell Park ' community center cost over 4.5 million dollars

Churches

Church On The Boulevard (formerly Evangelical Bible Church) / 2444 Washington Boulevard / 21230
New Covenant Community United Church (formerly St. Marks United Church of Christ) / 1805 Wickes Avenue / 21230
New Beginnings Seventh-Day Adventist Church (formerly Sexton United Methodist Church) / 1721 Sexton Street / 21230
The Purpose Center / 2728 Washington Blvd / 21230

References

Neighborhoods in Baltimore
Southwest Baltimore